American singer Mario has released five studio albums, one compilation album, one extended play, seventeen singles (including four as a featured artist), six promotional singles and twenty-one music videos. In his career, Mario has charted 15 entries on Billboards Hot R&B/Hip-Hop Songs chart. His four studio albums—Mario, Turning Point, Go and D.N.A.—all reached the top 5 on Billboards Top R&B/Hip-Hop Albums chart. To date, Mario has sold 2.3 million albums, 4.8 million downloads and earned 591 million streams in the US, according to Nielsen Music.

Albums

Studio albums

Compilation albums

Extended plays

Singles

As lead artist

As featured artist

Promotional singles

Other charted songs

Guest appearances

Music videos

As featured artist

Notes

References

Discographies of American artists
Rhythm and blues discographies